Thượng Lan is a commune (xã) and village in Việt Yên District, Bắc Giang Province, in northeastern Vietnam. 
Thượng Lan includes Cham, Ha Thuong, Son Ha, Ha, Ha Boi, Ruong, Nguon.

References

Populated places in Bắc Giang province
Communes of Bắc Giang province